The 1972 All Ireland Camogie Championship was won by Cork who defeated Killkenny by a four margin in the final for their third successive success of a four-in-a-row. It was the first final in which the new look camogie uniform of the 1970s was used. The match drew an attendance of 4,000. It marked the first appearance in a final of the 15-year-old Angela Downey, arguably the greatest player in the history of camogie.

Semi-finals
It was the second last year before the introduction of the open draw in camogie, Galway were graded junior. Kilkenny, who defeated Wexford 6-4 to 5-6 in the Leinster final with three goals from Maura Cassin and two from Angela Downey, had no opposition in the semi-final. Cork defeated Antrim in the second semi-final with a strong second half performance.

Final
It was a tense final with both free takes Liz Garvan and Ann Carroll missing from positions from which they would normally have scored. Angela Downey scored the first of the game’s three goals for Kilkenny, Liz Garvan scored Cork’s first goal from a free and Ann Carroll scored Cork’s second and deciding goal from a sideline ball. Shortly after the final, Liz Garvan travelled to Zambia to take up a teaching job and was lost to the game. Agnes Hourigan wrote in the Irish Press: The pity of yesterday’s game was that it never got off the ground. Both teams seemed to be too tense from the start and though Cork did manage to relax somewhat when they got ahead in the closing stages, one felt, considering the obvious talent of both teams, that the fare provided was only an insipid shadow of what it might have been, The marking was very close throughout, and while it had its moment’s the final never gave us the fast spectacular open play that we had seen earlier in the junior decider. Kilkenny, one felt, did a great deal to beat themselves. They never settled down and even in the second half it was not unusual to see three or four of their players in one another’s way.

Final stages

MATCH RULES
50 minutes
Replay if scores level
Maximum of 3 substitutions

See also
 All-Ireland Senior Hurling Championship
 Wikipedia List of Camogie players
 National Camogie League
 Camogie All Stars Awards
 Ashbourne Cup

References

External links
 Official Camogie website
 History of Camogie senior championship slideshow. presented by Cumann Camógaíochta Communications Committee at GAA Museum January 25, 2010 part one, part two, part three and part four
 Historic newspaper reports of All Ireland finals
 Camogie on official GAA website
 Timeline: History of Camogie
 Camogie on GAA Oral History Project
 Camogie Websites for  Antrim and Dublin

1972
1972
All-Ireland Senior Camogie Championship
All-Ireland Senior Camogie Championship
All-Ireland Senior Camogie Championship